Arachis pintoi, the Pinto peanut, is a forage plant native to Cerrado vegetation in Brazil. It is native to the valleys of the upper São Francisco and the Jequitinhonha rivers of Minas Gerais. It has been named after the Brazilian botanist Geraldo Pinto, who first collected the plant at the locality of Boca do Córrego, município de Belmonte (State of Bahia) in 1954 and suggested its potential as a forage. The species has been first described by A. Krapovickas and W. Gregory in 1994.

This wild perennial relative of the groundnut or peanut, has been of increasing importance to pasture improvement in the tropics. Its stoloniferous growth habit, subterranean seed production, high forage quality, and acceptability to grazing cattle are of particular value. It is widely used in tropical grazing systems for ruminant livestock. The most common cultivar was first released in 1989 as cv. 'Amarillo' in Australia. Subsequently, it was released as cv. 'Mani Forrajero Perenne' in Colombia in 1992. It has been widely distributed in the tropics as accession CIAT 17434.

References

External links

 EMBRAPA:Arachis pintoi photo 
 Neotropical Herbarium Specimens
 Tropical Forages
 Biology and Agronomy of Forage Arachis edited by P.C. Kerridge & B. Hardy (1994)

pintoi
Forages
Flora of Brazil